Olig is a former settlement in Kern County, California. Olig still appeared on maps as of 1912.

Olig is within the boundaries of the huge McKittrick Oil Field, and gives its name to one of the oil pools within the unit, which was also the first to be discovered (1896).

References

Former settlements in Kern County, California
Former populated places in California